Seidler is a German and Yiddish occupational surname. Notable people with the surname include:

Aldo Emilio Seidler (born 1954), Argentine chess master
Alma Seidler (1899–1977), Austrian actress
David Seidler (born 1937), British-American playwright
Ernst Seidler von Feuchtenegg (1862–1931), Austrian Prime Minister from 1917 to 1918
Franz W. Seidler (born 1933), German historian
Harry Seidler (1923–2006), Austrian-Australian architect, spouse of Penelope Seidler
Helga Seidler (born 1949), German athlete
Kamilla Seidler (born 1983), Danish chef
Karoline Seidler-Wranitzky (1790–1872), Czech operatic soprano
Louise Seidler (1786–1866), German painter
Michal Seidler (born 1990), Czech futsal
Penelope Seidler (born 1938), Australian architect, spouse of Harry Seidler
Peter Seidler (born 1960), American businessman
Stefan Seidler, German politician

See also

Şeidlər, Azerbaijan
Harry and Penelope Seidler House
Rose Seidler House

References

German-language surnames

cs:Seidler
fr:Seidler
it:Seidler
ja:ザイドラー
pt:Seidler
ru:Зайдлер